Casanovas Peak is the ice dome rising to 325 m at the base of Ioannes Paulus II Peninsula on Livingston Island, South Shetland Islands. It is linked to Rotch Dome on the west by Berrister Gap and surmounts Etar Snowfield to the northwest, Berkovitsa Glacier to the northeast and Verila Glacier to the south.

The feature is named for Àlex Simón i Casanovas, mountain guides’ team leader at Juan Carlos I Base in 2001–06, who surveyed the peak during the 2000-01 austral summer.

Location

Maps
 L.L. Ivanov et al. Antarctica: Livingston Island and Greenwich Island, South Shetland Islands. Scale 1:100000 topographic map. Sofia: Antarctic Place-names Commission of Bulgaria, 2005.
 L.L. Ivanov. Antarctica: Livingston Island and Greenwich, Robert, Snow and Smith Islands. Scale 1:120000 topographic map.  Troyan: Manfred Wörner Foundation, 2009.

References
 Casanovas Peak. SCAR Composite Antarctic Gazetteer
 Bulgarian Antarctic Gazetteer. Antarctic Place-names Commission. (details in Bulgarian, basic data in English)

External links
 Casanovas Peak. Copernix satellite image

Mountains of Livingston Island
Bulgaria and the Antarctic
Spain and the Antarctic